Joseph Murphy was an Irish hurler. At club level he played for Ferrybank and was a substitute on the Waterford senior hurling team that won the 1948 All-Ireland Championship. Murphy's uncle, Charlie Ware, was a member of the Waterford team that lost the  1938 All-Ireland final.

References

Ferrybank hurlers
Waterford inter-county hurlers
Year of birth missing
Possibly living people